James Walter Grimston, 2nd Earl of Verulam (20 February 1809 – 27 July 1895), known as Viscount Grimston from 1815 to 1845, was a British peer and Conservative politician. He was the eldest son of James Walter Grimston, 1st Earl of Verulam, and Lady Charlotte Jenkinson. He succeeded his father as 2nd Earl of Verulam in November 1845.

In 1860, The Times noted that Grimston was one of only three to hold peerages in all three Kingdoms of England, Scotland and Ireland.

Family
Lord Verulam married Elizabeth Joanna Weyland, daughter of Richard Weyland, in 1844. They had six children:
 Lady Harriot Elizabeth Grimston (c.1845 – 15 August 1888), married Maj.-Gen. Francis Harwood Poore on 6 March 1885
 Lady Jane Grimston (12 December 1848 – 2 November 1920), married Sir Alfred Jodrell, 4th Baronet on 25 February 1897
 James Walter Grimston, 3rd Earl of Verulam (1852–1924)
 Cmdr. William Grimston (7 January 1855 – 10 May 1900)
 Lady Maud Grimston (c.1857 – 3 September 1929), married Maj. Paulyn Rawdon-Hastings, son of the 1st Baron Donington and the 10th Countess of Loudoun, and had issue
 Canon Robert Grimston (18 April 1860 – 8 July 1928), married Gertrude Villiers and had issue, including the Conservative politician Robert Grimston, 1st Baron Grimston of Westbury.

Lord Verulam died in July 1895, aged 86, and was succeeded in his titles by his eldest son James.

Politics and business
Verulam was elected to the House of Commons for St Albans in 1830, a seat he held until 1831, and then represented Newport, Cornwall from 1831 to 1832 and Hertfordshire from 1832 to 1845. The latter year Verulam succeeded his father in the earldom and entered the House of Lords. He later served in the first two administrations of the Earl of Derby as a Lord-in-waiting (government whip in the House of Lords) in 1852 and from 1858 to 1859. Between 1845 and 1892 he also held the honorary post of Lord Lieutenant of Hertfordshire, in succession to his father.

During a period of unrest in 1830 he raised the Cashio Troop of Hertfordshire Yeomanry Cavalry at the family seat of Gorhambury House and commanded it with the rank of Captain. In 1832 it became a troop of the South Hertfordshire Yeomanry Cavalry, of which he became second-in-command with the rank of Major. He was promoted to Lieutenant-Colonel in 1847 when he and the commanding officer, James Gascoyne-Cecil, 2nd Marquess of Salisbury, exchanged positions. He retained the command until 1864

Cricket and other sport
Verulam played first-class cricket as a right-handed batsman. He was mainly associated with Marylebone Cricket Club (MCC), making 21 appearances from 1830 to 1849. In contemporary scorecards to 1845, he was given as Lord Grimston. He was also a supporter of the boxing arts and in the early 1850s, he and his brother Robert frequented middleweight champion Nat Langham's Rum Pum-Pas club, a dining and boxing establishment in Westminster popular with the aristocracy.

Several members of his family were first-class cricketers: three of his brothers Edward, Robert and Francis all played, as did his nephews Walter Grimston and Lord Hyde.

Folklore Society 
Verulam was the first President of the Folklore Society, serving in the role between 1878 and 1879. It has been suggested that Verulam - like the second and third Presidents of the Society, Frederick Lygon, 6th Earl Beauchamp and George Byng, 3rd Earl of Strafford - was not a folklore scholar but lent his patronage to the Society through the efforts of W. J. Thoms, Director of the Society but known to Verulam as deputy librarian of the House of Lords.

Notes

References
 Kidd, Charles, Williamson, David (editors). Debrett's Peerage and Baronetage (1990 edition). New York: St Martin's Press, 1990, 
 Charles Mosley (ed.) Burke's Peerage, Baronetage & Knightage, 107th edition, 3 vols. (Wilmington, Delaware, U.S.A.: Burke's Peerage (Genealogical Books) Ltd, 2003), vol. 2, p. 2407.
 Lt-Col J.D. Sainsbury, The Hertfordshire Yeomanry: An Illustrated History 1794–1920, Welwyn: Hart Books/Hertfordshire Yeomanry and Artillery Historical Trust, 1994, ISBN 0-948527-03-X.

External links 
 
 

1809 births
1895 deaths
English cricketers
English cricketers of 1826 to 1863
Marylebone Cricket Club cricketers
Grimston, James Grimston, Viscount
Conservative Party (UK) Baronesses- and Lords-in-Waiting
Lord-Lieutenants of Hertfordshire
Grimston, James Grimston, Viscount
Grimston, James Grimston, Viscount
Grimston, James Grimston, Viscount
Grimston, James Grimston, Viscount
Grimston, James Grimston, Viscount
Grimston, James Grimston, Viscount
UK MPs who inherited peerages
Gentlemen cricketers
Married v Single cricketers
Non-international England cricketers
Presidents of the Marylebone Cricket Club
Gentlemen of England cricketers
Hertfordshire Yeomanry officers
2
James
Members of the Parliament of the United Kingdom for Hertfordshire
Presidents of the Folklore Society
A to K v L to Z cricketers